The 1977–78 All-Ireland Senior Club Football Championship was the eighth staging of the All-Ireland Senior Club Football Championship since its establishment by the Gaelic Athletic Association in 1970-71.

Austin Stacks were the defending champions, however, they were beaten by Thomond College in the semi-final of the Munster club Championship.

On 26 March 1978, Thomond College won the championship following a 2-14 to 1-03 defeat of St. John's in the All-Ireland final at Croke Park. It remains their only championship title.

Results

Munster Senior Club Football Championship

First round

Semi-finals

Final

All-Ireland Senior Club Football Championship

Quarter-final

Semi-finals

Final

Championship statistics

Miscellaneous

 St. Mary's won the Connacht Club Championship title for the first time in their history. They were also the first team from Sligo to win the provincial title.
 Summerhill won the Leinster Club Championship for the first time in their history. They were also the first team from Meath to win the provincial title.
 St. John's won the Ulster Club Championship for the first time in their history. They were also the first team from Antrim to win the provincial title.

References

1977 in Gaelic football
1978 in Gaelic football